Georgios Kontopoulos (born 16 November 1970) is a retired Greek football striker.

References

1970 births
Living people
Levadiakos F.C. players
Ilisiakos F.C. players
Ethnikos Asteras F.C. players
Agios Dimitrios F.C. players
Super League Greece players
Association football forwards
Footballers from Athens
Greek footballers